The 2011–12 Premier League of Bosnia and Herzegovina was the twelfth season of the Premier League of Bosnia and Herzegovina, the highest football league of Bosnia and Herzegovina. The 2011–12 fixtures were announced on 5 July 2011. The season began on 6 August 2011 and ended on 23 May 2012. A winter break with no matches was scheduled between 28 November and 3 March, but was extended for a week due to heavy snowfalls. Borac lost their title from the previous season to Željezničar, which secured the first position after round 27, with 3 matches left to play.

Sixteen clubs participated in the season, including fourteen returning from the 2010–11 season and one promoted club from each second-level league.

Teams

Budućnost Banovići and Drina Zvornik were relegated to their respective second-level league at the end of the 2010–11 season. Both clubs returned to the second tier after just one year each at the Premijer Liga.

The relegated teams were replaced by the champions of the two second-level leagues, GOŠK Gabela from the Prva Liga FBiH and Kozara Gradiška from the Prva Liga RS. Kozara returned to the top league after eight years in second level and GOŠK debuted in the top level.

Stadiums and locations

Personnel and kits

Note: Flags indicate national team as has been defined under FIFA eligibility rules. Players may hold more than one non-FIFA nationality.

Managerial changes

Season events

Incident in Travnik–Borac game

The match between Travnik and Borac was abandoned during halftime after the main referee of the match was attacked by a member of Travnik. The disciplinary commission fined Travnik  and pronounced that the team would play their next two home matches without spectators, though this was later reduced to a single match.

Away fans ban

The ban on away fans commenced on 8 October 2011 by the Football Federation of Bosnia and Herzegovina after a pair of incidents caused by Ultras groups. Intended to end in 2011, the ban was extended to the start of the 2012–13 season.

Several incidents preceded the ban: 
In the 21 August 2011 match between Zrinjski and Olimpic, members of Ultras Mostar (a Zrinjski fan club), angrily stormed the field after Olimpic scored their third goal. 
In the 24 August 2011 match between Slavija and Sarajevo, Sokolovi (a Slavija fan club) chanted insulting jeers during the game. Later in the match, ten people managed to enter the field during play. Zrinjski was penalized with a  fine, while Slavija received a  fine and were prohibited spectators at their following two home games.
In the eighth round match between Borac and Željezničar, immediately after Željezničar took the lead, the Lešinari Ultras (a Borac fan club) broke through the emergency exit. They stormed the field and attacked The Maniacs (a Željezničar fan club) with flares and stones. Several Maniacs were wounded in the altercation. The competition commission registered the game as a 0–3 win for Željezničar, while the disciplinary commission punished Borac with a  fine and banned spectators from their next three home games.
In the 28 September 2011 match between Zrinjski and Velež at Bijeli Brijeg Stadium, after Velež took the lead in the final minutes of the game, Ultras Mostar broke into the field and chased the Velež players. Zrinjski was punished for this incident by the disciplinary commission with a  fine and were forced to play their next five home matches without spectators. The game was registered with an official result of 0–3 for Velež.
The final incident before the ban occurred in Sarajevo before the friendly match between Željezničar and Hajduk from Croatia.  Torcida Split (a Hajduk fanclub) came to the stadium three hours before the match. Because of the small number of police officers at the stadium at that point, they were able to enter the south stand of Grbavica stadium. In the stands, a small group of The Maniacs were preparing the tifo (fan choreography) for the match. The members of Torcida Split began disrupting this, provoking an altercation that spiraled into a riot. The game was cancelled due to this.

The ban was lifted on 31 July 2012, before the start of the 2012–13 Premier League of Bosnia and Herzegovina.

League table

Positions by round

Results

Clubs season-progress

Season statistics

Top goalscorers

Most assists

Hat-Tricks

4 Player scored 4 goals

Clean sheets

Most clean sheets: 19
Željezničar
Fewest clean sheets: 5
Travnik

Champion squad

Notes
1Without matches played on empty stadiums because of suspension.

See also
2011–12 Kup Bosne i Hercegovine
Football Federation of Bosnia and Herzegovina

References

External links

Facebook
Soccerway
SportSport
worldfootball

Premier League of Bosnia and Herzegovina seasons
Bos
1